Jon Lynn Christensen (born February 20, 1963) is an American politician and corporate executive who is a former member of the United States House of Representatives.

Early life
Jon Lynn Christensen was born on February 20, 1963, in St. Paul, Nebraska, to Audrey and Harlan Christensen. He graduated from St. Paul High School, earned a Bachelor of Arts in business and biology from Midland Lutheran College in 1985, and a Juris Doctor from South Texas College of Law in Houston in 1989. He was admitted to the bar in Nebraska in 1992.

Career
Christensen was vice president of COMREP, Inc. He was a marketer and salesperson for Connecticut Mutual Insurance Company. For his last several years prior to serving in Congress, he was an insurance executive and helped form the Aquila Group, Inc.

Christensen was elected as a Republican to the 104th and 105th United States Congresses serving from January 3, 1995, to January 3, 1999. In 1998, he ran for Governor of Nebraska but came third in the Republican primary behind State Auditor John Breslow and Mike Johanns, who went on to win the general election.

Personal life
Christensen has been married twice. He married Meredith Stewart Maxfield in 1987. The marriage ended in divorce in 1996. In 1998, he married the former Miss America, Tara Dawn Holland; they have two daughters.

Christensen is a member of the ReFormers Caucus of Issue One.

References

 
 
 

1963 births
Living people
People from St. Paul, Nebraska
South Texas College of Law alumni
Nebraska lawyers
Midland University alumni
Republican Party members of the United States House of Representatives from Nebraska

Members of Congress who became lobbyists